Kevin Gomez-Nieto (born 11 January 1994) is a Dutch footballer who plays as a right-back for Scheveningen in the Dutch Tweede Divisie.

Career
Gomez-Nieto began his career at the Feyenoord academy before he was released in 2013.

After leaving Feyenoord, Gomez-Nieto joined English Premier League side Stoke City in the summer of 2013 following a successful trial. He played ten games for Stoke's under-21 side in the 2013–14 season and upon the conclusion of the campaign he was not offered a contract and returned to the Netherlands.

He went on trial at Eerste Divisie side Helmond Sport and a successful trial at Helmond earned him a contract with the club. Soon after, Gomez-Nieto made his professional debut on 29 August 2014 in a 4–1 defeat against NEC.

Gomez-Nieto player for SVV Scheveningen between 2015 and 2019 before moving to Quick Boys. In April 2021, he returned to Scheveningen.

Personal life
Gomez-Nieto has mixed Dutch and Spanish heritage.

References

External links
 

1994 births
Living people
Dutch footballers
Dutch people of Spanish descent
Feyenoord players
Stoke City F.C. players
Helmond Sport players
Eerste Divisie players
Tweede Divisie players
Derde Divisie players
Footballers from Zoetermeer
Association football fullbacks
SVV Scheveningen players
Quick Boys players